Bratana is an American  heavy metal band formed in 2006 by Val Lapin and Serge Zuravka in Los Angeles CA. The band was initially called SoulSale. The first studio album, Rockin' Addiction featuring the single Kill Puppets with Sen Dog (Cypress Hill) and produced by Billy Graziadei was released via 13 Music Ltd. on January 24, 2017.

The current band line-up includes Jake Fehres on bass, Alejandro Mercado on drums, and the addition of Patrick Morton and Alex Messano on guitars, Val Lapin vocals.

On January 24 of 2017 Bratana opened for UDO Dirkschneider  at the Whisky a Go Go.

December 20th of 2019, Bratana released a new single "False Ambitions" via DSN Music,  and was produced Billy Graziadei at Firewater Studios in Hollywood, CA.

References

2006 establishments in California
Musical groups from Los Angeles
Heavy metal musical groups from California